Elmer Clifton (March 14, 1890 – October 15, 1949) was an American writer, director and actor from the early silent days.

Early life 
Elmer Clifton Forsyth was born in Toronto, Ontario, Canada, to Cecil Carl Forsyth and Margaret Nicolle.

Career
A collaborator of D.W. Griffith, he appeared in The Birth of a Nation (1915) and Intolerance (1916) before giving up acting in 1917 to concentrate on work behind the camera, with Griffith and Joseph Henabery as his mentors. His first feature-length solo effort as a director was The Flame of Youth with Jack Mulhall.

Clifton honed his talents during the late 1910s, directing vehicles for Mulhall and Herbert Rawlinson at Universal and then for Dorothy Gish for Famous Players-Lasky. Two of his projects with Gish, Nobody Home and Nugget Nell, featured performances from pre-stardom Rudolph Valentino. Most of this early output has been lost. He was the first filmmaker to discover the talents of Clara Bow, whom he cast in Down to the Sea in Ships, released on March 4, 1923. The independently produced film was well reviewed for its visual authenticity.

During the 1920s, Clifton directed films for several different studios. During the filming of The Warrens of Virginia (1924) for Fox Film Corporation, lead actress Martha Mansfield suffered a fatal accident from burns when her costume caught fire. Clifton directed The Wreck of the Hesperus for Cecil B. deMille's production company, and filmed on location in the Grand Canyon for The Bride of the Colorado. He also directed some Technicolor short films, including Manchu Love with an all-Asian cast.

In the sound era, Clifton wrote and directed many poverty row Westerns and "exploitation" classics, among them the anti-marijuana polemic Assassin of Youth (1937). He also directed the vice films Gambling with Souls (1936), Slaves in Bondage (1937) and City of Missing Girls (1941), all of which portrayed addiction and white slavery to some degree. 

His last film Not Wanted (1949), was finished by producer Ida Lupino after Clifton suffered a heart attack three days into filming and was unable to work anymore. He died in 1949 of a cerebral hemorrhage shortly after the film's release.

Personal life 
Clifton married actress Helen Kiely on November 29, 1926. The couple had three children: Actress Dorinda Clifton, a daughter named Patricia, and a son named Michael.

Selected filmography

Partial filmography

Actor

References

External links
 
 

1890 births
1949 deaths
American film directors
American male film actors
American male silent film actors
Film serial crew
20th-century American male actors
Burials at Forest Lawn Memorial Park (Glendale)